Arrive Having Eaten is an EP by indie rock band Pinback.

Track listing
 "Sleep Bath" – 3:24
 "Anti-Hu (version)" – 4:12
 "Hohum" – 3:39
 "Seville (version)" – 4:16

Pinback albums
2003 EPs